Huxford is an unincorporated community in Escambia County, Alabama, United States. Huxford had a post office until November 5, 2011; it still has its own ZIP code, 36543. Huxford is located along the route of the Federal Road. Huxford has a population of 197 people.

References

Unincorporated communities in Escambia County, Alabama
Unincorporated communities in Alabama